Krystal Meyers is the self-titled debut album by Krystal Meyers, released in 2005 on Essential Records. Krystal's first album was a pop punk album comparable to Ashlee Simpson and Avril Lavigne.

Track listing

Adapted from AllMusic entry.

References

2005 debut albums
Krystal Meyers albums
Essential Records (Christian) albums